The Outcasts is the first in a series of novels called Brotherband by Australian author John Flanagan. The book was released in Australia and the United States on 1 November 2011 and in New Zealand on 4 November 2011.

Synopsis 
In Skandia, there is only one way to become a warrior. Boys are chosen for teams called brotherbands and must endure three months of gruelling training in seamanship, weapons and battle tactics. It's brotherband against brotherband, fighting it out in a series of challenges. Only one brotherband can win.

Plot
12 years before the book, Mikkel, Hal(the protagonist)'s father, died on a raiding trip. Before his death he had his best friend, Thorn, promise that he would help Hal. Thorn promises but loses his right hand on the voyage back. Once in Skandia he becomes a drunk, wallowing in self-pity, however, Hal's mother, Karina, reminds Thorn of his promise and employs him in her inn/eating house.

Hal Mikkelson, 16, has become a boy who builds whatever he thinks of with the help of his best friends, Stig and Thorn. At the same time he works with Anders, the local shipbuilder. During this time Hal buys an incomplete ship from Anders and finishes building it, naming it the Heron because the sail design was based on a heron's wing. After sailing the Heron with a few boys Hal recruited, Hal halts work on it to prepare for Brotherband training. During Brotherband training, boys who are 16 in Skandia are taught the basics of fighting and ship navigation. For each Brotherband, a leader must be chosen - this year there are a total of 28 boys divided into 3 Brotherbands: The Sharks, The Wolves, and The Herons. With Hal finding himself the unwilling leader of the Herons, made up of the Heron's crew and a few additional boys, all outcasts, he must step up to the challenge. Every Brotherband must participate in team and individual activities to earn points. At the end of Brotherband training the points are totaled up. Hal manages to win permission to use the Heron in the sailing challenges.

While Brotherband training continues, a Skandian trading fleet is attacked. The leader of the pirates, Zavac, demands to know about the secret treasure of Skandia, the Andomal, a precious amber stone that washed up on the shores of Skandia a long time ago. The leader of the trading fleet vows not to tell until he sees that one of the pirates had grabbed his nephew. Knowing that his nephew shouldn’t die for his mistakes, the head of the trading fleet begins to tell Zavac about the Andomal, knowing that it is well guarded. As he talks he remembers that one night every year it is not so well protected.

Zavac arrives on the shores of Hallasholm, the Skandian capital, with his "damaged" ship, and claims to be a troubled sailor. Erak, the Oberjarl, or leader of the Skandians, allows them to stay, but appoints Thorn to keep watch on them; he suspects foul play.

Hal and the Herons defeat both rival Brotherbands and are given the honor of defending the Andomal for a night, as is the tradition. Hal leaves the site temporarily to check on the Heron and the watchman falls asleep, allowing Zavac and his pirates to infiltrate the site and steal the Andomal. When it is discovered, a furious Erak harshly scolds the boys, takes away the horned helmets they won, erases the Heron Brotherband from the competition, and demands that they give over their weapons and the Heron. However, the Heron Brotherband, together with Thorn, uses the Heron to chase after Zavac for a chance at redemption and respect.

References

External links 
 The Outcasts at Random House Australia
 The Outcasts at Random House New Zealand
 The Outcasts at Penguin Group (USA)

Brotherband books
2011 Australian novels
Random House books
Philomel Books books